Li Shilong (born August 10, 1977) is a Chinese chess Grandmaster. In 2002, he became China's 14th Grandmaster.

In 2005 at the 5th Asian Chess Championship in Hyderabad, India, he came second with 7.5/9 points behind Zhang Zhong. He has competed in numerous tournaments, including the Amsterdam tournament, Groningen Chess Festival, Corus tournament, Aeroflot Open, Noteboom Memorial, Cappelle-la-Grande Open and the Chinese Chess Championship, besides others.

In September 2008, Li won the 4th Prospero Pichay Cup in a field of eighteen grandmasters at the Duty Free Fiesta Mall in Parañaque. He scored 7½/9 with one point clear from the rest of the field.

In 2011 he won the 8th IGB Dato' Arthur Tan Malaysia Open in Kuala Lumpur.

See also
Chess in China

References

External links
Li Shilong chess games at 365Chess.com

1977 births
Living people
Chess grandmasters
Chess players from Guangzhou
Place of birth missing (living people)